In mathematical analysis, the uniform norm (or ) assigns to real- or complex-valued bounded functions  defined on a set  the non-negative number

The name "uniform norm" derives from the fact that a sequence of functions  converges to  under the metric derived from the uniform norm if and only if  converges to  uniformly.

If  is a continuous function on a closed and bounded interval, or more generally a compact set, then it is bounded and the supremum in the above definition is attained by the Weierstrass extreme value theorem, so we can replace the supremum by the maximum.
In particular, if  is some vector such that  in finite dimensional coordinate space, it takes the form:

Metric and topology

If we allow unbounded functions, this formula does not yield a norm or metric in a strict sense, although the obtained so-called extended metric still allows one to define a topology on the function space in question.

The binary function

is then a metric on the space of all bounded functions (and, obviously, any of its subsets) on a particular domain. A sequence  converges uniformly to a function  if and only if

We can define closed sets and closures of sets with respect to this metric topology; closed sets in the uniform norm are sometimes called uniformly closed and closures uniform closures.

For complex continuous functions over a compact space, this turns it into a C* algebra.

Properties

The set of vectors whose infinity norm is a given constant,  forms the surface of a hypercube with edge length 

The reason for the subscript "" is that whenever  is continuous

where

See also

References

Banach spaces
Functional analysis
Normed spaces
Norms (mathematics)